Liberty National is a country club in Jersey City, New Jersey adjacent to Liberty State Park on the Upper New York Bay. Its clubhouse, guest villas, teaching center, and "Cafe 12" halfway house were designed by Lindsay Newman Architecture and Design and the course was designed by Robert E. Cupp and Tom Kite.

The club cost over $250 million to build, making it one of the most expensive golf courses in history. Club designers added amenities such as an on-site helistop, yacht services, spa, and restaurant.

Tournaments hosted
Liberty National hosted The Northern Trust (formerly The Barclays and the Westchester Classic), in 2009, 2013, 2019, and 2021. In 2009, Heath Slocum won with a score of  one stroke ahead of four  In August 2013, Australian Adam Scott won by one stroke over four runners-up. Due to negative feedback from many players in 2009, the course underwent many changes prior to the 2013 playing.

In 2019, The Northern Trust – the first of three events of the PGA TOUR's FedEx Cup Playoffs – was played at Liberty National from August 8–11. It was won by Patrick Reed, with a score of 268 (–16). In 2021, it was again the first event of the FedEx Cup Playoffs and was won by Tony Finau with a score of 264 (–20).

Presidents Cup
Liberty National hosted the Presidents Cup in 2017.

Caven Point controversy
Caven Point is a  bird sanctuary in Liberty State Park along the Hudson River Waterfront Walkway adjacent to the golf course. The owners of the course would like to lease the land to expand the course with additional holes. The proposal would require privatization of publicly-owned land and disruption of the fragile ecosystem. Proposals to protect the land have been made in the New Jersey Legislature to specifically protect the park from commercial development without a severe vetting process and public scrutiny.

Scorecard

Notable members
Liberty National has notable members such as:
Rudolph W. Giuliani
Cristie Kerr
Robert Kraft
Eli Manning
Phil Mickelson
Justin Timberlake
Mark Wahlberg
Matt Harvey

References

External links
 
The Northern Trust 
The Presidents Cup
 Business Insider: photo tour

Golf clubs and courses in New Jersey
Golf clubs and courses designed by Robert E. Cupp
Sports in Hudson County, New Jersey
Tourist attractions in Jersey City, New Jersey
2006 establishments in New Jersey
Presidents Cup venues